are a type of "primitive" ukiyo-e style Japanese woodblock prints. They were usually printed in pink (beni) and green, occasionally with the addition of another color, either printed or added by hand. 

The production of benizuri-e reached its peak in the early 1740s. Torii Kiyohiro, Torii Kiyomitsu I, Torii Kiyonobu I, Okumura Masanobu, Nishimura Shigenaga, and Ishikawa Toyonobu are the artists most closely associated with benizuri-e.

Gallery of benizuri-e

References
 Lane, Richard. (1978).  Images from the Floating World, The Japanese Print. Oxford: Oxford University Press. ;  OCLC 5246796
 Newland, Amy Reigle. (2005). Hotei Encyclopedia of Japanese Woodblock Prints.  Amsterdam: Hotei. ;  OCLC 61666175 
 Roberts, Laurance P., A Dictionary of Japanese Artists, Tokyo, Weatherhill, 1976, 218.

Ukiyo-e genres